Dominik Cristina García-Lorido (born August 16, 1983) is an American actress. She is known for her roles in The Lost City as Mercedes Fellove and City Island as Vivian Rizzo (the daughter of the character played by her real-life father, Andy García). She was a main cast member in the Starz drama Magic City (2012–2013).

Early life
García-Lorido was born in Miami, Florida to Maria Victoria "Marivi" Lorido and actor Andy García. She is the eldest of four children, with sisters Daniella and Alessandra, and brother Andrés. Her parents are both of Cuban descent. Her father was born in Havana and her maternal grandparents were from Taramundi, Asturias, Spain. She grew up in Los Angeles and began dancing at the age of three.

Career
García-Lorido's debut was in 2005's The Lost City, a film directed by her father, who also starred in it, having taken 15 years to enter production. It reinforced García-Lorido's desire to act professionally and work more with her father.

García-Lorido eventually received more substantial roles. In 2008, she appeared in three films, including the racially-charged drama  as well as Reflections and La Linea, the last of which starred her father. In 2009, García-Lorido appeared in the feature film City Island, as the onscreen daughter of her real-life father.

In 2019, she was featured in the third and sixth episodes of the final season of the television series Mr. Robot, which starred Rami Malek and Christian Slater.

Filmography

Film

Television

References

External links

1983 births
Actresses from Florida
American film actresses
American people of Cuban descent
American people of Spanish descent
American people of Asturian descent
Hispanic and Latino American actresses
Living people
Actresses from Miami
21st-century American women